Colorado's 2nd Senate district is one of 35 districts in the Colorado Senate. It has been represented by Republican Jim Smallwood since 2023. Prior to redistricting the district was represented by Republicans Dennis Hisey and Kevin Grantham.

Geography
District 2 covers suburbs and exurbs of Colorado Springs and other parts of central Colorado, including all of Clear Creek, Fremont, Park, and Teller Counties and parts of El Paso County. Communities in the district include Idaho Springs, Georgetown, Fairplay, Cañon City, Florence, Lincoln Park, Penrose, Cripple Creek, Woodland Park, Fountain, Cascade-Chipita Park, Ellicott, Fort Carson, and parts of Security-Widefield.

The district overlaps with Colorado's 2nd and 5th congressional districts, and with the 13th, 18th, 19th, 20th, 21st, 39th, 47th, and 60th districts of the Colorado House of Representatives.

Recent election results
Colorado state senators are elected to staggered four-year terms. The old 2nd district held elections in midterm years, but the new district drawn following the 2020 Census will hold elections in presidential years.

Incumbent Senator Dennis Hisey was redistricted to the 11th district and is seeking re-election there in 2022; 4th district Senator Jim Smallwood, meanwhile, will hold the 2nd district seat beginning in 2023.

2018

2014

Federal and statewide results in District 2

Senators

References 

2
Clear Creek County, Colorado
El Paso County, Colorado
Fremont County, Colorado
Park County, Colorado
Teller County, Colorado